A  is an apprentice geisha.
Maiko may also refer to:

Places
Maiko National Park, a national park in the Democratic Republic of the Congo
Maiko Station (舞子駅), a railway station in Tarumi-ku, Kobe, Hyōgo Prefecture, Japan
Maiko-kōen Station (舞子公園駅), a railway station in Tarumi-ku, Kobe, Hyōgo Prefecture, Japan
Nishi-Maiko Station (西舞子駅), a railway station in Tarumi-ku, Kobe, Hyōgo Prefecture, Japan
Ōmi-Maiko Station (近江舞子駅), a railway station in Ōtsu, Shiga, Japan
 , a river in the Democratic Republic of the Congo, tributary of the Congo River

Other uses
Maiko (given name)

See also
Maico 2010, a manga series
Maiko Haaaan!!!, a Japanese comedy film released in 2007